Ceuthophilus is a genus of insects in the cave cricket family Rhaphidophoridae. It contains most of the species that are known commonly as camel crickets.

These insects have thick, dorsally arched bodies. The head is oval in shape with long, tapering antennae. The hind femur is thick and usually spiny in males, and sometimes slightly spiny in females.

Ceuthophilus have varied diets and have been described as omnivores and scavengers. Items observed in the diets of Ceuthophilus species include jelly, tuna, rancid liver, American cheese, pet food, oatmeal, wheat germ, peanut butter, molasses, wild fungi, persimmon, bread, dead and living insects, insect eggs, arachnids, dead bats, dead ring-tailed cats, and human feces.

Species include:

References

Further reading
Taylor, S. J., et al. Phylogeography of cave crickets (Ceuthophilus spp.) in central Texas: A keystone taxon for the conservation and management of federally listed endangered cave arthropods. Illinois Natural History Survey Technical Report 2007.

 
Ensifera genera
Orthoptera of North America
Insects described in 1862